The 1978 World Rally Championship was the sixth season of the Fédération Internationale de l'Automobile (FIA) World Rally Championship (WRC).  The schedule remained largely similar to the previous year, with the exception of the removal of the Rally New Zealand from the schedule.

1978 was the last season with an official world championship only for manufacturers. Scoring was modified in 1977 to a more complex system including points both for overall and group placement. A car would still have to place in the overall top 10 to score points. In addition to the Championship for Manufacturers, the FIA awarded the FIA Cup for Rally Drivers. All rallies of the WRC, in addition to another ten events, were counted towards the drivers' totals. In 1979, the Cup for Drivers was incorporated into the WRC as the World Rally Championship for Drivers.

Events

Map

Schedule and results

Standings

Manufacturers' championship

FIA Cup for Drivers

Pointscoring systems

Manufacturers' championship

See also 
 1978 in sports

External links

 FIA World Rally Championship 1978 at ewrc-results.com

World Rally Championship
World Rally Championship seasons